The 2007 Champ Car Atlantic Season was the thirty-third Champ Car Atlantic season, its sixth season as the prime feeder series for the Champ Car World Series. It began on April 8, 2007 and ended on August 12 after 12 races. The Cooper Tires Presents the Champ Car Atlantic Championship Powered by Mazda Drivers' Champion was Raphael Matos driving for Sierra Sierra Enterprises.

Drivers and teams 
The following teams and drivers competed in the 2007 Champ Car Atlantic season.  All teams used the Swift 016.a chassis powered by a Mazda-Cosworth 2.3 liter inline-4 engine and Cooper tires.

Grands Prix 

The Denver Grand Prix has been cancelled by Champ Car as of February 1

Full Series results

Races

Drivers 

Point scoring system:
 1st – 20th = 31–27–25–23–21–19–17–15–13–11–10–9–8–7–6–5–4–3–2–1
Bonus points:
 1 for fastest race lap
 1 for fastest Friday qualifying lap
 1 for fastest Saturday qualifying lap
 1 for most positions gained from starting position

The most points a single driver can earn in a single race is 34.

See also
 2007 Champ Car season
 2007 Indianapolis 500
 2007 IndyCar Series season
 2007 Indy Pro Series season

External links
ChampCarStats.com

References

Atlantic Championship seasons
Atlantic Season, 2007
Atlantic Championship Season 2007
Atlantic Championship